In differential geometry, the Neovius surface is a triply periodic minimal surface originally discovered by Finnish mathematician Edvard Rudolf Neovius (the uncle of Rolf Nevanlinna).

The surface has genus 9, dividing space into two infinite non-equivalent labyrinths. Like many other triply periodic minimal surfaces it has been studied in relation to the microstructure of block copolymers, surfactant-water mixtures, and crystallography of soft materials.

It can be approximated with the level set surface

In Schoen's categorisation it is called the C(P) surface, since it is the "complement" of the Schwarz P surface.  It can be extended with further handles, converging towards the expanded regular octahedron (in Schoen's categorisation)

References

Differential geometry
Minimal surfaces